Cyclone Ingrid was a tropical cyclone which struck northern Australia during the 2004–05 Australian region cyclone season. Its minimum pressure was 924 mbar (hPa).

Meteorological history

Originally a low-pressure system north of the Gulf of Carpentaria, Ingrid moved eastward and developed into a tropical cyclone in the Coral Sea on 6 March 2005. A strong pressure gradient rapidly developed within the system as it headed west resulting in a category rating of 5 by 8 March. The eye, with very destructive wind gusts up to 220 km/h within a 20 km radius, reached the far northern coast of the Australian state of Queensland between 6am and 9am on 10 March 2005 AEST, and hit the Cape York Peninsula. However, it was downgraded to a Category 2 storm as it crossed the peninsula north of the towns of Coen and Lockhart River.

After passing the town of Weipa, Ingrid gained strength once again as it moved out across the Gulf of Carpentaria towards the Northern Territory. It struck the town of Nhulunbuy as a Category 5 storm. It crossed the Cobourg Peninsula in the early hours of 13 March, heading west. Ingrid struck the Tiwi Islands as a Category 4 storm, and moved west into the Timor Sea, being downgraded to a category 3 due to the passage over land. Winds were in excess of 200 km/h.

On 15 March Ingrid approached the north coast of the Kimberley region of Western Australia as a Category 4 storm, and made landfall near Kalumburu shortly afterwards. It quickly weakened as it moved inland, and soon completely dissipated.

(Note: The storm categories above are as defined by the Australian Bureau of Meteorology, and differ from those used in the United States.)

Preparations

Queensland
In Far North Queensland, several hundred residents, including some in Aboriginal communities, evacuated from areas deemed vulnerable to shelters by 9 March. Tourists in resorts on Lizard Island and Cape Tribulation were evacuated the same day. Local communities throughout the coastline were supplied with sandbags and relief materials. To reduce damage from trees, workers cut numerous trees down ahead of the storm. Three Aboriginal communities, with a total population of 1,500, and nearby Cooktown, home to 2,000 people, were placed on standby for evacuation. In Cairns, emergency officials stockpiled sandbags and concerns were raised about 20% of the 130,000 people that live in the city never experiencing a cyclone within the past five years. In Lockhart River, an estimated 700 people evacuated to shelters prior to the storm. On the western coast of Queensland, residents took precautions prior to a weakened Ingrid as a "code blue alert" was declared.

Northern Territory
On 11 March, officials in the Northern Territory advised the 4,000 residents of Nhulunbuy to evacuate to higher ground. On Melville Island, 1,500 aborigines evacuated to shelter throughout the island. One of the most important local events, the Australian rules football final, was cancelled due to Ingrid. On Croker Island, 300 residents evacuated to cyclone shelters prior to the storm.

Western Australia
In Kalumburu, residents in the most vulnerable areas were evacuated to shelters.

Impact

Papua New Guinea
Rough seas produced by Cyclone Ingrid capsized a boat off the coast of Papua New Guinea, killing five of the 13 occupants.

Queensland
Damages from the storm in Queensland amounted to A$5.3 million (US$4.1 million).

Northern Territory
The isolated communities along the coast of Northern Territory suffered considerable damage, and there was localised flooding in the coastal areas due to high tides.

On Croker Island, 30 homes sustained damage, some of which lost their roofs, numerous trees were downed, power was cut to most residences, cars were completely destroyed and numerous roads were damaged. Nearly all trees on the island were leveled by  wind gusts. Schools were reportedly destroyed in addition to several homes. Much of the infrastructure of the Tiwi Islands was affected, some suffering consequential damage due to trees falling on buildings and vehicles. Damages on the islands amounted to A$5 million (US$3.9 million). Throughout the Northern Territory, an additional A$10 million (US$6.4 million) in damages resulted from Ingrid.

Darwin experienced high winds and heavy rain, but was only affected by the southern edge of the cyclone.

Western Australia
The Great Northern Highway was closed between Kununurra and Halls Creek for a period of 36 hours due to flooding.

A resort area, known as "Faraway Bay", northeast of Kalumburu was completely destroyed by the storm. Numerous homes lost power and water supply, some sustained major roof damage and severe flooding isolated a few communities. Large areas of forested area were completely destroyed by Ingrid.

See also 

 List of tropical cyclones
 Tropical cyclones in 2005

References

External links

 Australian Bureau of Meteorology: Tropical Cyclone Ingrid
 Darwin spared Ingrid's fury (Aust BC News, 14 March 2005. 10:58pm, AEDT)
 Ingrid batters top end (from ABC News Online - Saturday, 12 March 2005. 8:36pm AEDT)
 Cyclone Ingrid maintains intensity (from ABC News Online - Wednesday, 9 March 2005. 1:03am AEDT)
 Emergency services prepare for Cyclone Ingrid (from ABC News Online - Tuesday, 8 March 2005. 10:09pm AEDT)
 The wind velocities were subsequently reassessed based on meteorological and observed damage on the ground and findings delivered at a seminar in Darwin on 7 September 2005.

2005 in Australia
2004–05 Australian region cyclone season
History of Western Australia
Retired Australian region cyclones
Category 5 Australian region cyclones
Ingrid